Joseph Bova (May 25, 1924 – March 12, 2006) was an American actor. He worked in early television, having a children's show on WABC-TV in New York, and played Prince Dauntless in the Broadway musical Once Upon a Mattress, starring Carol Burnett.

Bova was born in Cleveland, Ohio, the son of Mary (née Catalano) and Anthony Bova. He died of emphysema at the Actor's Fund retirement home in Englewood, New Jersey. He was 81 years old.

Filmography

References

External links

1924 births
2006 deaths
American male stage actors
American male television actors
Deaths from emphysema
Northwestern University alumni
Male actors from Cleveland
20th-century American male actors